Dongfeng is a town of Kailu County in eastern Inner Mongolia, China, located along China National Highway 303 about  from Tongliao. , it has 14 villages under its administration.

See also 
 List of township-level divisions of Inner Mongolia

References 

Township-level divisions of Inner Mongolia
Kailu County